Catherine Young (or similar) may refer to:

Catharine Young (politician) (born 1960), American legislator
Catharine Young (journalist), (1826–1908), British journalist
Catharine Young (scientist), South African neuroscientist
Katherine Young (1901–2005), Chinese-American centenarian
Catherine Young (1918–1967), stage name of German-born film and television actress Kaaren Verne
Katherine K. Young (born 1944), Canadian historian and academic
Kathy Young (born 1945), American pop singer
Kathy McEdwards (née Young; born 1957), Canadian curler
Cathy Young (born 1963), Russian-born American journalist and author
 Cathy Young (vocalist) (born 1951), Canadian folk singer and songwriter
Kathryn Young, American rower, see 1990 World Rowing Championships
Katie Young, American beauty pageant contestant, Miss Texas USA 1992
Kate Young, Australian breaststroke swimmer, see 2002 Oceania Swimming Championships
Kate Young (politician), Canadian politician
 Kate Young (musician), Scottish fiddle player, singer and composer, performs as Kate in the Kettle

See also
Kathleen Young Baxter (1901–1988), English activist for women's rights 
Caroline Kate "Kay" Young (born 1944), Canadian provincial legislator
Young Catherine, 1991 American TV miniseries based on the early life of Catherine the Great
Young (surname)